Mount Pleasant Township is one of the fourteen townships of Jefferson County, Ohio, United States.  The 2010 census found 2,368 people in the township, 1,374 of whom lived in the unincorporated portions of the township.

Geography
Located in the southwestern corner of the county, it borders the following townships:
Smithfield Township - north
Warren Township - east
Pease Township, Belmont County - southeast
Colerain Township, Belmont County - south
Wheeling Township, Belmont County - southwest corner
Short Creek Township, Harrison County - west

Two villages are located in Mount Pleasant Township: Mount Pleasant in the center, and part of Dillonvale in the northeast.

Name and history
Mount Pleasant Township was founded in 1807. It was named from the village of Mount Pleasant contained within its borders.

It is the only Mount Pleasant Township statewide.

Government
The township is governed by a three-member board of trustees, who are elected in November of odd-numbered years to a four-year term beginning on the following January 1. Two are elected in the year after the presidential election and one is elected in the year before it. There is also an elected township fiscal officer, who serves a four-year term beginning on April 1 of the year after the election, which is held in November of the year before the presidential election. Vacancies in the fiscal officership or on the board of trustees are filled by the remaining trustees.

References

External links
County website

Townships in Jefferson County, Ohio
Townships in Ohio
Populated places established in 1807
1807 establishments in Ohio